Layland is an unincorporated community in Fayette County, West Virginia, United States. Layland has a post office with ZIP code 25864.

A former variant name was Gentry.

Mining disaster

Layland was the site of a deadly mining explosion on March 2, 1915 in which 112 men were killed either by immediate impact or gas-induced suffocation. In the days following, approximately 53 survivors emerged from the mine after creating barricades to shield from the deadly gas. A memorial was established in 2014 to honor the victims and survivors.

References

Unincorporated communities in Fayette County, West Virginia
Unincorporated communities in West Virginia
Coal towns in West Virginia
Coal mining disasters in West Virginia